The Knox United Soccer Club is an Australian semi-professional soccer club based in the Melbourne suburb of Rowville, operating under license from Football Federation Victoria. Currently competing in the southern conference of Victorian State League Division 5, the club was established by members of the Melbourne's Italian community in 1993.

In 1993, members of the Knox’s Italian community to facilitate 2 mens teams playing in the Vicsoccer competition.  The club soon established its base at the Knox Italian Community Club in Karoo Rd, Rowville and quickly worked to improve facilities with new club rooms and playing surface.

In 2003, Knox United entered a women’s team in FFV competition and was rewarded with a Division 4 title in 2004.  That same year, our first junior team was introduced and playing in the FFV Rooball competition.

In 2006, the club took a conscientious decision to expand their junior program for the benefit of children and families in the Rowville and surrounding areas.  From that decision, we have expanded as a club.

In 2009, the club voted to become an incorporated association with a new constitution which helped us to attain Level 1 FFV A.C.E. Club Accreditation.

In 2018, after a long hiatus from senior football, the club took to competitive state football for the 2018 Football Federation Victoria season finishing ninth in VSL 5 south. For the 2019 season, United finished 5th.

Knox United SC is a proud, family friendly community for our soccer players and supporters across the Knox region.

References

Soccer clubs in Melbourne
Association football clubs established in 2003
Italian-Australian culture in Melbourne
Italian-Australian backed sports clubs of Victoria
Victorian State League teams
2003 establishments in Australia
Sport in the City of Knox